The Love Affairs of Hector Dalmore is a 1921 German silent drama film directed by Richard Oswald and starring Conrad Veidt, Erna Morena, and Kitty Moran. It premiered in Berlin on 22 February 1921.

Cast

References

Bibliography

External links

1921 films
Films of the Weimar Republic
German silent feature films
German drama films
Films directed by Richard Oswald
1921 drama films
German black-and-white films
Silent drama films
1920s German films